The 1939 Michigan State Spartans football team represented Michigan State College as an independent during the 1939 college football season. In their seventh season under head coach Charlie Bachman, the Spartans compiled a 4–4–1 record and lost their annual rivalry game with Michigan by a 26 to 13 score. In inter-sectional play, the team defeated Syracuse (14–2) and Temple (18–7) and lost to Santa Clara (6–0).

Schedule

Game summaries

Michigan

On October 7, 1939, the Aggies opened their season with a 26 to 13 victory over Michigan. The game, the 34th played between the two programs, was played at Michigan Stadium before 68,618 spectators that The New York Times called "a howling throng."

Michigan took a 26 to 0 lead at halftime. The Wolverines' first points came on three-yard run around the right end by Paul Kromer, with blocking by Tom Harmon and Forest Evashevski, capping a 65-yard touchdown drive. On the opening play of the second quarter, Harmon scored on a two-yard run, capping a drive that started at Michigan State's 33-yard line. On the ensuing Michigan State drive, Archie Kodros intercepted a pass at the Spartans' 20-yard line, and after a 15-yard penalty was assessed, Michigan took over on the five-yard line. From there, Harmon threw a touchdown pass to Evashevski. Michigan's final score followed a second interception by Kodros, with Kodros catching the ball at the 45-yard line and returning it 17 yards to the 28-yard line. On fourth down from the four-yard line, Harmon threw his second touchdown pass to Evashevski. In the third quarter, Bill Batchelor of Michigan State intercepted a pass and returned it 25 yards for a touchdown. In the fourth quarter, the Spartans scored again on a 71-yard pass play from Bill Kennedy to Wyman Davis. Harmon and William Melzow each kicked one point after touchdown (PAT) in the game.

References

Michigan State
Michigan State Spartans football seasons
Michigan State Spartans football